Acolyte is the debut studio album by the English alternative dance band Delphic, released by Polydor Records on 11 January 2010. It was recorded mostly in Ewan Pearson's Berlin studio. The album was released in Australia and New Zealand on 22 January via Modular and in the United States on 29 June 2010 by Dangerbird Records.

Track listing

Singles
 The band released the tracks Counterpoint and This Momentary on 13 April 2009 and 31 August 2009 respectively prior to the completion of the album. This Momentary later became available as a free Digital Download on iTunes to help promote the album.
 The first single to be released from the album was Doubt and was released on 4 January 2010, a week prior to the release of the album. The single entered the UK Singles Chart at number 79, the most successful song from the band yet. Its B-Side was Sanctuary.
 The second single to be released from the album was Halcyon and was released on 15 March 2010. The single reached a peak of number 143 on the UK Singles Chart marking the band's second most successful single to date. Its B-Side was Wake.
 The third single to be released from the album was Counterpoint and acted as a re-release of the single. It was released on 31 May 2010, although it was the Tim Goldsworthy Remix that received the radio airplay. The single failed to make an impact on the UK Singles Chart.

Charts

Weekly charts

Year-end charts

Personnel
All Tracks Written By – Delphic
Drums By – Dan Hadley
Published By – Universal Music Publishing, Ltd.
Produced By – Delphic and Ewan Pearson
Mixed By – Ewan Pearson and Bruno Ellingham
Photo Images By – Non-Format and Jake Walters
Art Direction and Design By – Non-Format
Dangerbird A+R – Jeff Castelaz and Peter Walker

References

External links
Delphic Official Website 
Dangerbird Records – Delphic: Acolyte – Album Release Info
Delphic – Acolyte on Rdio
Delphic – Acolyte on Spotify
Acolyte – "Doubt" Promo Video – YouTube
Acolyte – "Counterpoint" Promo Video – YouTube
Acolyte – "This Momentary" Promo Video – YouTube
Acolyte – "Halcyon" Promo Video – YouTube
Acolyte – "Remain" Promo Video – YouTube
Acolyte – "Doubt" (Live at WFUV) – YouTube
Acolyte – "Counterpoint" (Live at WFUV) – YouTube

2010 debut albums
Delphic albums